20D

 Canon EOS 20D, camera.
 20D/Westphal, comet.